Zara Yaqob (Ge'ez: ዘርዐ ያዕቆብ; 1399 – 26 August 1468) was Emperor of Ethiopia, and a member of the Solomonic dynasty who ruled under the regnal name Kwestantinos I (Ge'ez: ቈስታንቲኖስ, "Constantine"). He is known for the ge'ez literature that flourished during his reign, the  handling of both internal Christian affairs and external Muslim aggression, along with the founding of Debre Birhan as his capital. He reigned for 34 years and 2 months.

The British historian, Edward Ullendorff, stated that Zara Yaqob "was unquestionably the greatest ruler Ethiopia had seen since Ezana, during the heyday of Aksumite power, and none of his successors on the throne – excepted only the emperors Menelik II and Haile Selassie – can be compared to him."

Ancestry 
Born at Telq in the province of Fatajar, Zara Yaqob hailed from the Amhara people and was the youngest son of Emperor Dawit I by his wife, Igzi Kebra. 

His mother Igzi lost her first son and having been sick during her second pregnancy, prayed fervently to the Virgin Mary to keep her new child alive. Her prayers were answered and she gave birth to Zara Yaqob, who had this miracle recorded in the Ta'ammara Maryam (one of Zara Yaqob's chronicles).

Reign 
Paul B. Henze repeats the tradition that the jealousy of his older brother Emperor Tewodros I forced the courtiers to take Zara Yaqob to Tigray where he was brought up in secret, and educated in Axum and at the monastery of Debre Abbay. While admitting that this tradition "is invaluable as providing a religious background for Zara Yaqob's career", Taddesse Tamrat dismisses this story as "very improbable in its details". The professor notes that Zara Yaqob wrote in his Mashafa Berhan that "he was brought down from the royal prison of Mount Gishan only on the eve of his accession to the throne."

Upon the death of Emperor Dawit, his older brother Tewodros ordered Zara Yaqob confined on Amba Geshen (around 1414). Despite this, Zara Yaqob's supporters kept him a perennial candidate for Emperor, helped by the rapid succession of his older brothers to the throne over the next 20 years, which left him as the oldest qualified candidate. David Buxton points out the effect that his forced seclusion had on his personality, "deprived of all contact with ordinary people or ordinary life." Thrust into a position of leadership "with no experience of the affairs of state, he [Zara Yaqob] was faced by a kingdom seething with plots and rebellions, a Church riven with heresies, and outside enemies constantly threatening invasion." Buxton continues,
In the circumstances it was hardly possible for the new king to show adaptability or tolerance or diplomatic skill, which are the fruit of long experience in human relationships. Confronted with a desperate and chaotic situation he met it instead with grim determination and implacable ferocity. Towards the end of his life, forfeiting the affection and loyalty even of his courtiers and family he became a lonely figure, isolated by suspicion and mistrust. But, in spite of all, the name of this great defender of the faith is one of the most memorable in Ethiopian history.

Although he became Emperor in 1434, Zara Yaqob was not crowned until 1436 at Axum, where he resided for three years. It was not unusual for Ethiopian rulers to postpone their coronation until later in their reigns.

After he became emperor, Garad Mahiko, the son of the Hadiya ruler Garad Mehmad, refused to submit to Abyssinia. However, with the help of one of Mahiko's followers, the Garad was deposed in favor of his uncle Bamo. Garad Mahiko then sought sanctuary at the court of the Adal Sultanate. He was later slain by the military contingent "Adal Mabrak," who had been in pursuit. The chronicles record that the "Adal Mabrak" sent Mahiko's head and limbs to Zara Yaqob as proof of his death. Zara Yaqob invaded Hadiya after they failed to pay the annual tribute exacted upon them by the Ethiopian Empire, and married its princess Eleni, who was baptized before their marriage. Eleni was the daughter of the former king of the Hadiya Kingdom (one of the Muslim Sidamo kingdoms south of the Abay River), Garad Mehamed. Although she failed to bear him any children, Eleni grew into a powerful political person. When a conspiracy involving one of his Bitwodeds came to light, Zara Yaqob reacted by appointing his two daughters, Medhan Zamada and Berhan Zamada, to these two offices. According to the Chronicle of his reign, the Emperor also appointed his daughters and nieces as governors over eight of his provinces. These appointments were not successful.

He defeated Badlay ad-Din, the Sultan of Adal at the Battle of Gomit in 1445, which consolidated his hold over the Sidamo kingdoms in the south, as well as the weak Muslim kingdoms beyond the Awash River. Similar campaigns in the north against the Agaw and the Falasha were not as successful. The first time the title of the coastal regions' ruler, Bahr Negash, appears is during the reign of Emperor Zara Yaqob, who perhaps even introduced that office. 

After witnessing a bright light in the sky (which most historians have identified as Halley's Comet, visible in Ethiopia in 1456), Zara Yaqob founded Debre Berhan and made it his capital for the remainder of his reign.
 
In his later years, Zara Yaqob became more despotic. When Takla Hawariat, abbot of Dabra Libanos, criticized Yaqob's beatings and murder of men, the emperor had the abbot himself beaten and imprisoned, where he died after a few months. Zara Yaqob was convinced of a plot against him in 1453, which led to more brutal actions. He increasingly became convinced that his wife and children were plotting against him, and had several of them beaten. Seyon Morgasa, the mother of the future emperor Baeda Maryam I, died from this mistreatment in 1462, which led to a complete break between son and father. Eventually relations between the two were repaired, and Zara Yaqob publicly designated Baeda Maryam as his successor. Near the end of his reign, in 1464/1465, Massawa and the Dahlak archipelago were pillaged by emperor Zara Yaqob, and the Sultanate of Dahlak was forced to pay tribute to the Ethiopian Empire.

According to a manuscript written in 1784, Zara Yaqob persecuted many idolaters who admitted to worshipping pagan gods such as Dasek, Dail, Guidale, Tafanat, Dino and Makuawze. These idolators were decapitated in public. Spies also revealed that his sons Galawdewos, Amda Maryam, Zar'a Abraham and Batra Seyon, and his daughters Del Samera, Rom Ganayala and Adal Mangesha were all idolators and thus they were all executed as a result.

In the sixteenth century Adal leader Ahmed ibn Ibrahim al-Ghazi ordered the destruction of his former palace in Debre Birhan.

Ethiopian Church
When Zara Yaqob assumed the throne, the Ethiopian Church had been divided over the issue of Biblical Sabbath observance for roughly a century. One group, which was loyal to the Coptic Orthodox Church of Alexandria, believed that the day of rest should be observed only on Sunday, or Great Sabbath. Another group, the followers of Ewostatewos, believed with its founder that both the original seventh-day Sabbath (Saturday, or Lesser Sabbath) and Sunday should be observed.

Zara Yaqob was successful in persuading two recently-arrived Egyptian Abuna, Mikael and Gabriel, into accepting a compromise aimed at restoring harmony with the House of Ewostatewos, as the followers of Ewostatewos were known. At the same time, he made efforts to pacify the House of Ewostatewos. While the Ewostathians were won over to the compromise by 1442, the two Abuns agreed to the compromise only at the Council of Debre Mitmaq in Tegulet (1450).

Zara Yaqob also continued as the defender of the Patriarch of Alexandria. When he heard in 1441 of the destruction of the Egyptian monastery of Debre Mitmaq by Sayf ad-Din Jaqmaq, the Mamluk sultan of Egypt, he called for a period of mourning, then sent a letter of strong protest to the Sultan. He reminded Jaqmaq that he had Muslim subjects whom he treated fairly, and warned that he had the power to divert the Nile, but refrained from doing so for the human suffering it would cause. Jaqmaq responded with gifts to appease Zara Yaqob's anger, but refused to rebuild the Coptic churches he had destroyed.

According to Richard Pankhurst, Zara Yaqob was also "reputedly an author of renown", having contributed to Ethiopian literature as many as three important theological works. One was Mahsafa Berha "The Book of Light", an exposition of his ecclesiastical reforms and a defence of his religious beliefs; the others were Mahsafa Milad "The Book of Nativity" and Mahsafa Selassie "The Book of the Trinity".

Foreign affairs 

Zara Yaqob sent delegates to the Council of Florence in 1441, and established ties with the Holy See and Western Christianity. They were confused when council prelates insisted on calling their monarch Prester John. They tried to explain that nowhere in Zara Yaqob's list of regnal names did that title occur. However, the delegates' admonitions did little to stop Europeans from referring to the monarch as their mythical Christian king, Prester John.

He also sent a diplomatic mission to Europe (1450), asking for skilled labour. The mission was led by a Sicilian, Pietro Rombulo, who had previously been successful in a mission to India. Rombulo first visited Pope Nicholas V, but his ultimate goal was the court of Alfonso V of Aragon, who responded favorably. Two letters for Ethiopians in the holy land (from Amda Seyon and Zara Yaqob) survive in the Vatican library, referring to "the kings Ethiopia."

Notes

Citations

Sources

Further reading

External links 
 The Chronicle of the Emperor Zara Yaqob, translated by Richard Pankhurst  Archive.org mirror

1399 births
1468 deaths
15th-century emperors of Ethiopia
15th-century monarchs in Africa
Solomonic dynasty